The Eulhae Purge occurred in 1755 during the reign of Yeongjo of Joseon. Yeongjo, who supported Noron, had a grudge against Soron (Korean political faction). Before Yeongjo became king, Noron advocated for his regency during the illness of his reigning older brother, Gyeongjong of Joseon, which Soron opposed. Yeongjo forced Soron out of power and put Noron in power. Five members of Soron were accused of treason and executed.

 

Joseon dynasty
Political and cultural purges
Political history of Korea
18th century in Korea
1755 in Asia